Stoyan Radev is a Bulgarian theatre and film director. He graduated from the National Academy for Theatre and Film Art in 1998. He lives and works in Sofia, Bulgaria.

Theatre 
 2023 – “One Night Stand 2023”, stand-up comedy, National Palace of Culture
 2023 – "The Vagina Monologues" by Eve Ensler, Bonini Theatre
 2023 – "Performance and a Half" by Stoyan Radev, Bulgarian Army Theatre
 2022 – "No Exit" by Jean-Paul Sartre, Theatre "Vazrajdane"
 2022 – "Crimes of the Heart" by Beth Henley, Youth Theatre "Nikolay Binev"
 2022 – "Golemanov" by St.L. Kostov, National Theatre "Ivan Vazov"
 2022 – “Ministry of Happiness”, stand-up comedy, Three women on the Microphone 
 2022 – “One Night Stand 2022”, stand-up comedy, National Palace of Culture
 2021 – "All the Little Lights" by Jane Upton, Azaryan Theatre
 2021 – "Iva Is Online" by Iva Todorova, 199 Theatre
 2021 – "Cyrano de Bergerac" by Edmond Rostand, Bulgarian Army Theatre
 2021 – "Lament of an Angel" by Stefan Tsanev, National Theatre "Ivan Vazov"
 2020 – "Who's Afraid of Virginia Woolf" by Edward Albee, Little City Theatre 'Off The Channel'
 2020 – “The Good, the Bad and Krassimira”, stand-up comedy, Three Women on the Microphone
 2020 – “One Night Stand 2020”, stand-up comedy, National Palace of Culture
 2020 – "Ghost" based on Nikolay Haytov stories, National Theatre "Ivan Vazov"
 2019 – "A Woman of No Importance" by Oscar Wilde, Bulgarian Army Theatre
 2019 – "Le Libertin" by Éric-Emmanuel Schmitt, Sofia Theatre
 2019 – “One Night Stand 2019”, stand-up comedy, National Palace of Culture
 2018 – "An Attempt at Flying" by Yordan Radichkov, National Theatre "Ivan Vazov"
 2018 – "Nice to Meet You, I Am Iva" by Iva Todorova, 199 Theatre
 2018 – "Hangmen" by Martin McDonagh, Sofia Theatre
 2016 – "No Man's Land" based on the film script by Danis Tanovic, National Theatre "Ivan Vazov"
 2014 – "The Assassins of Salonika" by G. Danailov, National Theatre "Ivan Vazov"
 2010 – "Snegiryov" based on texts by F.M. Dostoyevsky, National Theatre "Ivan Vazov"
 2007 – "The Doll’s House" by Ibsen, Bulgarian Army Theatre
 2005 – "The Brothers Karamazov" by F.M. Dostoyevsky, Plovdiv Theatre
 2003 – "Salome" by Oscar Wilde, National Theatre "Ivan Vazov"
 2000 – "Solaris" by Stanislaw Lem, Theatre Laboratory Sfumato
 1998 – "An Etude for a Room and a Voice" based on "The Human Voice" by Jean Cocteau, Theatre Laboratory Sfumato
 1997 – "Shakespeare for the Fans" based on comedies by Shakespeare, Satire Theatre
 1996 – "Reprieve" based on texts by Kafka, Student's Theatre

Films, Music Videos, TV Commercials 

 2021 – "I Can Work"– a documentary film, Maria's World Foundation
 2015 – "Voices in the Chocho's Makeup Room" – a documentary film, Ikar Foundation
 2015 – "Worlds"– a documentary film, Maria's World Foundation
 2013 – "Fourth Estate" – TV series, BNT
 2013 – "And Bulgaria is a Giant Mistake Too" – a documentary film, Bulgarian Film Centre, Front Film
 2009 – "The Little Prince", a documentary film for the Big Read Campaign, BNT
 2008 – "In Memoriam" part of "15", a film omnibus comprising 15 short movies by 15 renowned Bulgarian directors, produced by Agitprop
 2005 – "Fate", a dance movie, TV

Nominations and awards 
 2022 – Nomination for Best Monodrama Askeer Awards (for "Iva is Online")  
 2022 – Best Performance Award, SOLO ACT International Monodrama Festival (for “Lament of an Angel”) 
 2022 – Viewers Choice Award for Best Theatre Performance on the Union of Bulgarian Artists Vote (for "Iva is Online")
 2022 – Nominated for Best Theatre Director by the Union of Bulgarian Artists for "Iva is Online"
 2021 – "Cyrano de Bergerac" voted Cultural Event of the Year by the readers of www.ploshtadslaveikov.com website
 2021 – Best Theatre Director Award by A'Askeer Academy (for "Who's Afraid of Virginia Woolf" and "Lament of an Angel") 
 2021 – nominated for Best Theatre Director by the Union of Bulgarian Artists (for "Ghost")
 2018 – Bronze Award, DSK BANK Customer Loans (4–6), FARA, Bulgaria
 2017 – Bronze Award, DSK BANK Customer Loans (1–3), FARA, Bulgaria
 2014 – Golden Quill Award for contribution to Bulgarian art and culture
 2014 – Bulgarian Film Academy Award for Best TV series, Fourth Estate
 2014 – CIRCOM award for Feature Film, Fourth Estate (TV series)
 2012 – Best TV Commercial, Shumensko "130 Anniversary", FARA, Bulgaria
 2011 – Silver Epica Award (Alcoholic Drinks), Shumensko "The Social Network"
 2011 – International Advertising Festival Golden Drum Best TVC nomination (Drinks), "The Social Network"
 2011 – Best TV Commercial, Shumensko "The Social Network", FARA, Bulgaria
 2010-2003 – Nominations for Best TV Commercial, FARA, Bulgaria
 2009 – "The Little Prince" voted "Best Movie" by the colleague participants in the Big Read TV campaign   
 2009 – Best TV Commercial, "Beckham", FARA, Bulgaria
 2009 – Top spot for a week of June on MTV World Chart Express, "Zoom" by Marius Moga, Nevena& Nivo
 2008-2002 – Nominations for Best Music Video, MMTV, BG Radio
 2007 – Best TV Commercial, "In Love", FARA, Bulgaria
 2002 – Best TV Commercial, "The Chorus", FARA, Bulgaria
 2007, 2005, 2003, 2000 – Nominated for Best Theatre Director by the Union of Bulgarian Artists and Askeer Awards

References 

Living people
1971 births
Bulgarian film directors
Bulgarian theatre directors